The cuneiform zi sign is a common multi-use sign of the Epic of Gilgamesh, the 1350 BC Amarna letters, and other cuneiform texts. It also has a sumerogrammic usage for ZI in the Epic of Gilgamesh. The structure of the cuneiform sign is like its twin, Gi (cuneiform), .

The "zi" sign has the syllabic usage for ze and zi, and a Sumerogram usage for ZI. Alphabetically "zi" can be used for z ("z" can be interchanged with any "s"); and "zi"/"ze" can be used for i, or e. In Akkadian, all 4 vowels, a, e, i, u are interchangeable with each other.

Epic of Gilgamesh usage
The zi sign usage in the Epic of Gilgamesh is as follows: ze-(6 times); gi-(46), ZI-(32 times).

References

Moran, William L. 1987, 1992. The Amarna Letters. Johns Hopkins University Press, 1987, 1992. 393 pages.(softcover)
 Parpola, 1971. The Standard Babylonian Epic of Gilgamesh, Parpola, Simo, Neo-Assyrian Text Corpus Project, c 1997, Tablet I through Tablet XII, Index of Names, Sign List, and Glossary-(pp. 119–145), 165 pages.

Cuneiform signs